Kings of Convenience is an indie folk-pop duo from Bergen, Norway, consisting of Erlend Øye and Eirik Glambek Bøe.

History

Øye and Bøe were both born in 1975 (Øye on 21 November and Bøe on 25 October) and have known each other since they met in the same class at school. Their first musical collaboration was a comedic rap about a teacher. At sixteen, they played together in the band Skog ("forest") with two other friends, releasing one EP, Tom Tids Tale, before breaking up and later forming the Kings duo.

The duo was signed to the American label Kindercore after appearing in European festivals during the summer of 1999. After a spell living in London in 2001, they released their debut album Quiet Is the New Loud. The album was produced by Coldplay producer Ken Nelson. The album was very successful and even lent its name to a small movement of musicians in the pop underground (including acoustic contemporaries such as Turin Brakes) which took Elliott Smith, Belle & Sebastian and Simon & Garfunkel as their inspiration and focused on more subtle melodies and messages. Kings of Convenience also inspired an indian music duo Parekh & Singh.

Versus, an album of remixes of tracks from Quiet Is the New Loud, came out shortly after. After this breakthrough year, not much was heard from the band. Øye spent the next few years living in Berlin and doing solo material, releasing music under the DJ Kicks series as well as a solo album titled Unrest. He also had a side project named The Whitest Boy Alive.

It was not until 2004 that the Kings' follow-up Riot on an Empty Street was released. The video made for "I'd Rather Dance With You," the second single from the album, topped MTV's European list as the best music video of 2004. The album also featured contributions by Feist.

In January 2008 the band played concerts in the Northern Norwegian cities of Tromsø, Svolvær and Bodø, and Swedish city Umeå along with a concert in August in Stockholm. The band then toured North America, Latin America and Europe, including stops in Boston, New York, Toronto, Detroit; Latin American stops in Mexico, Colombia, Argentina, Peru, Brazil and Chile, where they performed in Santiago with local musician Javiera Mena, who later opened for them in Spain and Portugal. European stops include Italy, Switzerland and Spain. On some of their American tour stops they appeared with the band Franklin for Short who joined them on stage for a few rousing numbers.

Their third album, called Declaration of Dependence, was released on 20 October 2009.

In June 2012, the band performed at the Primavera Sound festivals in both Barcelona and Porto.

In 2017, Eirik released an album entitled 'Analog Dance Music' with his new band Kommode.

In March 2019, Kings of Convenience provided an update regarding their upcoming (fourth) album, stating that "the songs were written and even performed live, but when we tried to record it during 2016/2017 for a mixture of reasons the results just weren’t good enough[, and] by that time I (Erlend) didn’t have anymore energy to pour into it[, ... so] 2018 was a charging battery year, and now we are planning to try again".

On 30 April 2021, Kings of Convenience released a new song, "Rocky Trail", after 12 years without publishing music as the duo. They also announced, through their official social network channels, that their fourth studio album, Peace or Love, is scheduled to be released on 18 June 2021 via EMI.
In connection with the album release, 28th of June 2021 a documentary about the duo was released for the first time, where they talk about the new album, and in general about the unity between them. It´s available on Youtube and is made by their good friend Stian Sævig, best known as the bass player in Kakkmaddafakka.

Discography

Albums

EPs
 Magic in the Air (Limited 3-track CD; includes cover of a-ha's "Manhattan Skyline") (Jan 2001, for Magic! RPM magazine)
 Playing Live in a Room (5-track CD) – Virgin – (2000)
 Kings of Convenience's Live Acoustic Sessions - Milan 2009 (4 track EP) (2010)

Singles

Music videos 
 1999 – Failure
 1999 – Toxic Girl
 2004 – Misread
 2004 – I'd Rather Dance with You
 2004 – Cayman Islands
 2009 – Mrs. Cold
 2009 – Boat Behind
 2009 – Me in You
 2021 – Rocky Trail

Collaborations
 Cornelius – "Drop (The Tusen Takk Rework)" (2002) and "Omstart" (2006)
 Feist – "Know-How" and "The Build Up" (Riot on an Empty Street), "Cayman Islands" from the "Know-How" single (2004) and in "Catholic Country" (Peace or Love)
 Biz Markie - "Clowns and Kings" Split Tour EP (2004)

References

External links
 Kings of Convenience official site
 Documentary on Kings of Convenience

Astralwerks artists
Norwegian indie rock groups
Norwegian indie pop groups
Musical groups established in 1999
1999 establishments in Norway
Musical groups from Bergen
Indie folk groups